Lappajärvi is a lake in Finland, in the municipalities of Lappajärvi, Alajärvi and Vimpeli. The lake is part of Ähtävänjoki basin together with Lake Evijärvi that is located downstream (north) of it.

The Lappajärvi impact structure is estimated to be 77.85 ± 0.78 million years old (Campanian age of the Late Cretaceous time period). Experts working on Finland's Onkalo spent nuclear fuel repository project have studied Lake Lappajärvi to help them project how Finnish landscapes might look one million years in the future and beyond.

An island in the middle of the lake, Kärnänsaari (Kärnä Island), gives the name to the black impact melt rock (impactite) found there, locally called kärnäite.

The towns on the shore are Lappajärvi and Vimpeli. Although not very near any, the nearest major city is Seinäjoki.

Earlier the lake was thought to have been an ancient volcano crater. In 1967, Swedish geologist Nils Bertil-Svensson examines kärnäite samples, and his article that Lappajärvi is a possible impact crater was published in Nature journal in February 1968.

Gallery

See also
Impact craters in Finland

References

External links
 
 Lappajärvi impact structure
 Lake Lappajärvi, a  meteorite impact site in western Finland by Martti Lehtinen (1976)

Impact craters of Finland
Cretaceous impact craters
Lappajärvi
Impact crater lakes